Roger Colglazier (born August 28, 1950) is an American former sprinter.

References

1950 births
Living people
American male sprinters
Place of birth missing (living people)
Universiade medalists in athletics (track and field)
Universiade gold medalists for the United States
Medalists at the 1970 Summer Universiade
20th-century American people